KSKT-CD, virtual channel 43 (UHF digital channel 36), is a low-powered, Class A television station serving San Diego, California, United States that is licensed to San Marcos. The station is owned by HC2 Holdings.

History
Prior to NRJ TV's sale of the station to HC2 Broadcasting on May 21, 2018, for $4 million, KSKT-CD operated on digital channel 36 as a direct repeater of co-owned independent station KSCI (channel 18). The station was founded on December 4, 1990, as K43DM. It changed to KSKT-CA on August 20, 2001, and to its present KSKT-CD on March 18, 2015.

Digital channels
The station's digital signal is multiplexed. The main subchannel broadcast BeIN Sports Xtra since May, 2021 until the fall 2022, when the programming was replaced with Timeless TV.

References

External links

SKT-CD
Television channels and stations established in 1990
San Marcos, California
Low-power television stations in the United States
Innovate Corp.
GetTV affiliates
Dabl affiliates
Buzzr affiliates